HMS Westminster was a W-class destroyer of the Royal Navy.  She was the first ship to bear the name.  Launched in 1918, she served through two World Wars, and survived both to be sold for scrap in 1947.

Construction and commissioning
Westminster was ordered on 9 December 1916 from Scotts Shipbuilding and Engineering Company, Greenock, Scotland with the 10th order of the 1916–17 Programme.  She was laid down in April 1917, launched on 24 February 1918 and commissioned on 18 April 1918.

First World War and interwar period
HMS Westminsters first role was escorting battle cruisers in the North Sea.  She was later an escort for the German High Sea Fleet on its way to Rosyth in November 1918 after the German surrender.

Less than one month after the war ended, Westminster was required to help evacuate the crew of cruiser  when she struck a mine.  Yet just one day later, in thick fog, Westminster herself collided with the V-class destroyer  and needed extensive repair. Westminster then served in the Baltic and was damaged in action with Russian warships. She then served in the 6th Flotilla, Atlantic Fleet in 1921, before being reduced to the Reserve.

By 1939 an extensive rearmament programme was underway. A number of old V and W-class destroyers were selected for refitting into anti-aircraft escorts. Westminster was among those reactivated, and she was taken in hand by Devonport Dockyard. The conversion lasted until December 1939, during which her pennant number was changed from L50 to D45, to conform with use as an Escort Destroyer. She carried out post refit trials in December, and was then recommissioned and nominated to carry out convoy defence duty in the North Sea.

Second World War

Westminster joined the Rosyth Escort Force in January, and deployed with them until April, when she transferred to the Dover Command to support military activities and cover convoys in the English Channel.  In early May, 1940, Westminster was one of four British destroyers supporting the French Army off the coast of Dunkirk, and supported the evacuation of Flushing. Her crew remained continuously at action stations for four days at a time and the ship successfully fought off air attacks, without any casualties until 15 May.  On 20 May she struck a submerged wreck off Dunkirk and sustained considerable damage. She put into Dunkirk for repair works, and was the last ship to be repaired there before the town fell to the Germans.

She returned to active duty in June and for the rest of the war, she served with the Rosyth Escort Force protecting important shipping convoys in home waters. Part of this duty included screening the maiden voyage of the battleship  from Tyne to Rosyth.  As Westminster had been converted for use as an escort and fitted with suitable high angle 4 in armament for anti-aircraft defence, she was retained for the protection of the vital East coast convoys and not deployed for other use such as support of the Allied landings in Normandy and service escorting of Russian convoys. She was also fitted with other weapons for attacks on E-boats as well as with special radio equipment for communication with aircraft and other escorts.

Westminster engaged E-boats of the 2nd German Flotilla on 12 October, in company with the destroyers  and  whilst defending convoy FN-31 as it sailed off the Norfolk coast.  She was in action again against E-boats, this time off Lowestoft with the corvette  and motor gunboats 88 and 91. Westminster sank three E-boats in total.  Only once was a German attack able to get past the escort to sink merchant shipping.

Postwar
After the end of the war Westminster was briefly employed as a destroyer courier to Norway, but was withdrawn from operational service and paid-off by mid June.  She was then reduced to the reserve and put on the disposal list in 1946.  She was sold to BISCO on 4 March 1947 and towed to the breakers' yard in Charlestown, near Rosyth, arriving there during August 1948. She was then broken up.

Notes

Bibliography
 
 
 
 
 
 
 
 
 
 
 
 
 
 

 

V and W-class destroyers of the Royal Navy
World War II destroyers of the United Kingdom
1918 ships